Vladimir Aleksandrovich Kukhlevsky (born 5 January 1959) is a Russian professional football coach and a former player.

External links
 

1958 births
Living people
Soviet footballers
Russian footballers
PFC CSKA Moscow players
Pakhtakor Tashkent FK players
FC SKA-Karpaty Lviv players
FC Halychyna Drohobych players
FC Hazovyk Komarno players
KS Lublinianka players
Russian expatriate footballers
Expatriate footballers in Hungary
Expatriate footballers in Ukraine
Expatriate footballers in Poland
Russian football managers
PFC Krylia Sovetov Samara managers
Russian Premier League managers
Russian expatriate sportspeople in Poland
FC Yenisey Krasnoyarsk managers
FC Lada-Tolyatti managers
Association football forwards
FC Yenisey Krasnoyarsk players